Henry Bell Van Rensselaer (1810–1864) was a US representative from New York and Union Army general.

Henry van Rensselaer may also refer to:
Hendrick van Rensselaer (1667–1740), director of the Claverack patent of the Rensselaerswyck manor
Henry K. Van Rensselaer (1744–1816), colonel in the American Revolution

See also
Van Rensselaer (surname)